
The Rhysling Awards are an annual award given for the best science fiction, fantasy, or horror poem of the year. The Rhyslings are named for a character in a science fiction story: the blind poet Rhysling, in Robert A. Heinlein's short story "The Green Hills of Earth". The award is given in two categories: "Best Long Poem", for works of 50 or more lines, and "Best Short Poem", for works of 49 or fewer lines.

The nominees for each year's Rhysling Awards are chosen by the members of the Science Fiction Poetry Association (SFPA). Each member may nominate one work for each of the categories. The nominated works are then compiled into an anthology called The Rhysling Anthology, and members of the Association then vote on the final winners. From 2005 to 2011, the Awards were presented in July at a ceremony at Readercon. While the "Best Short Poem" category allows very short poems to be entered the SFPA also has the Dwarf Stars Award which is for poems from one to ten lines.

In 2005, the SFPA published an anthology of the winning poems, The Alchemy of Stars: Rhysling Award Winners Showcase.

Best Long Poem winners
1978: Gene Wolfe, The Computer Iterates the Greater Trumps
1979: Michael Bishop, For the Lady of a Physicist
1980: Andrew Joron, The Sonic Flowerfall of Primes
1981: Thomas M. Disch, On Science Fiction
1982: Ursula K. Le Guin, The Well of Baln
1983: Adam Cornford, Your Time and You: A Neoprole's Dating Guide
1984: Joe Haldeman, Saul's Death: Two Sestinas
1985: Siv Cedering, A Letter from Caroline Herschel (1750-1848)
1986: Andrew Joron, Shipwrecked on Destiny Five
1987: W. Gregory Stewart, Daedalus
1988: Lucius Shepard, White Trains
1989 (tie): Bruce Boston, In the Darkened Hours; John M. Ford, Winter Solstice, Camelot Station
1990: Patrick McKinnon, dear spacemen
1991: David Memmott, The Aging Cryonicist in the Arms of His Mistress Contemplates the Survival of the Species While the Phoenix Is Consumed by Fire
1992: W. Gregory Stewart, the button and what you know
1993: William J. Daciuk, To Be from Earth
1994: W. Gregory Stewart and Robert Frazier, Basement Flats: Redefining the Burgess Shale
1995: David Lunde, Pilot, Pilot
1996: Margaret B. Simon, Variants of the Obsolete
1997: Terry A. Garey, Spotting UFOs While Canning Tomatoes
1998: Laurel Winter, why goldfish shouldn't use power tools
1999: Bruce Boston, Confessions of a Body Thief
2000: Geoffrey A. Landis, Christmas (after we all get time machines)
2001: Joe Haldeman, January Fires
2002: Lawrence Schimel, How to Make a Human
2003 (tie): Charles Saplak and Mike Allen, Epochs in Exile: A Fantasy Trilogy; Sonya Taaffe, Matlacihuatl's Gift
2004: Theodora Goss, Octavia Is Lost in the Hall of Masks
2005: Tim Pratt, Soul Searching
2006: Kendall Evans and David C. Kopaska-Merkel, The Tin Men
2007: Mike Allen, The Journey to Kailash
2008: Catherynne M. Valente, The Seven Devils of Central California
2009: Geoffrey A. Landis, Search
2010: Kendall Evans and Samantha Henderson, In the Astronaut Asylum
2011: C. S. E. Cooney, The Sea King's Second Bride
2012: Megan Arkenberg, The Curator Speaks in the Department of Dead Languages
2013: Andrew Robert Sutton, Into Flight
2014: Mary Soon Lee,  Interregnum
2015: F.J. Bergmann, 100 Reasons to Have Sex with an Alien
2016: (tie) Krysada Panusith Phounsiri, It Begins With A Haunting; Ann K. Schwader, Keziah
2017: Theodora Goss, Rose Child
2018: Neil Gaiman, The Mushroom Hunters
2019: Sarah Tolmie, Ursula le Guin in the Underworld
2020: Rebecca Buchanan, "Heliobacterium daphnephilum"

Best Short Poem winners
1978 (tie): Duane Ackerson, "The Starman"; Andrew Joron, "Asleep in the Arms of Mother Night"; Sonya Dorman, "Corruption of Metals"
1979 (tie): Duane Ackerson, "Fatalities"; Steve Eng, "Storybooks and Treasure Maps"
1980 (tie): Robert Frazier, "Encased in the Amber of Eternity"; Peter Payack, "The Migration of Darkness"
1981: Ken Duffin, "Meeting Place"
1982: Raymond DiZazzo, "On the Speed of Sight"
1983: Alan P. Lightman, "In Computers"
1984: Helen Ehrlich, "Two Sonnets" 
1985: Bruce Boston, "For Spacers Snarled in the Hair of Comets" 
1986: Susan Palwick, "The Neighbor's Wife" 
1987 (tie): Jonathan V. Post, "Before the Big Bang: News from the Hubble Large Space Telescope"; John Calvin Rezmerski, "A Dream of Heredity" 
1988 (tie): Bruce Boston, "The Nightmare Collector"; Suzette Haden Elgin, "Rocky Road to Hoe"
1989: Robert Frazier, "Salinity" 
1990: G. Sutton Breiding, "Epitaph for Dreams"
1991: Joe Haldeman, "Eighteen Years Old, October Eleventh" 
1992: David Lunde, "Song of the Martian Cricket" 
1993: Jane Yolen, "Will" 
1994 (tie): Bruce Boston, "Spacer's Compass"; Jeff VanderMeer, "Flight Is for Those Who Have Not Yet Crossed Over" 
1995: Dan Raphael, "Skin of Glass" 
1996: Bruce Boston, "Future Present: A Lesson in Expectation" 
1997: W. Gregory Stewart, "Day Omega" 
1998: John Grey, "Explaining Frankenstein to His Mother" 
1999: Laurel Winter, "egg horror poem" 
2000: Rebecca Marjesdatter, "Grimoire" 
2001: Bruce Boston, "My Wife Returns as She Would Have It" 
2002: William John Watkins, "We Die as Angels" 
2003: Ruth Berman, "Potherb Gardening" 
2004: Roger Dutcher, "Just Distance" 
2005: Greg Beatty, "No Ruined Lunar City" 
2006: Mike Allen, "The Strip Search" 
2007: Rich Ristow, "The Graven Idol's Godheart" 
2008: F.J. Bergmann, "Eating Light" 
2009: Amal El-Mohtar, "Song for an Ancient City" 
2010: Ann K. Schwader, "To Theia" 
2011: Amal El-Mohtar, "Peach-Creamed Honey" 
2012: Shira Lipkin, "The Library, After" 
2013: Terry A. Garey, "The Cat Star"
2014: Amal El-Mohtar, "Turning the Leaves"
2015: Marge Simon, "Shutdown" 
2016: Ruth Berman, "Time Travel Vocabulary Problems" 
2017: Marge Simon, "George Tecumseh Sherman's Ghosts" 
2018: Mary Soon Lee, "Advice to a Six-year-old"
2019: Beth Cato, "After Her Brother Ripped the Heads from Her Paper Dolls"
2020: Jessica Jo Horowitz, "Taking, Keeping"

References

External links
Official list of Rhysling Award winners
SFPA Rhysling Anthology
The Alchemy of Stars: Rhysling Award Winners Showcase

R
Science fiction awards
Fantasy poetry
American poetry awards
Fantasy awards
Horror fiction awards